Kensuke's Kingdom is an upcoming animated film based on the book of the same name by Michael Morpurgo.

Premise
A boy swept overboard during a storm on a worldwide sailing trip with his family washes ashore on an island in the Pacific Ocean. While there, he realises someone is nearby, aiding him with his survival.

Cast
Sally Hawkins as Mum
Cillian Murphy as Dad
Ken Watanabe as Kensuke
Raffey Cassidy as Becky

Production
It was announced in February 2019 that an animated film adaptation of Michael Morpurgo’s Book was in development, with Sally Hawkins, Cillian Murphy, Ken Watanabe and Raffey Cassidy set as part of the voice cast.

In September 2020, the film entered production after securing new financing.

References

External links
 

Upcoming films
British animated films
Films about castaways